Kanal may refer to:

 Kanal (unit), a unit of area equivalent to one-eighth of an acre, used in northern India and Pakistan
 Kanał, a 1956 Polish film directed by Andrzej Wajda
 Kanal (1979 film), a 1979 Turkish film
 Kanal (2015 film), a 2015 Indian Malayalam-language film starring Mohanlal
 Kanal, Zagreb, a city neighbourhood in Croatia
 Kanal, Iran, a village in Sistan and Baluchestan Province, Iran
 Municipality of Kanal ob Soči, in western Slovenia
 Kanal, Kanal, the administrative centre of Kanal ob Soči
 Tony Kanal, bassist for the musical group No Doubt
 KANAL — Centre Pompidou, a contemporary art museum in Brussels

See also
 Canal (disambiguation)